Two ships of the Japanese Navy have been named Take:

 , a  launched in 1919 and decommissioned in 1940. She was scuttled to be used as a breakwater in 1948
 , a  launched in 1944 and scrapped in 1947

Imperial Japanese Navy ship names
Japanese Navy ship names